The 2015 Omloop Het Nieuwsblad – Women's race was raced on 28 February 2015. It was the 10th women's edition of the Omloop Het Nieuwsblad. The race started and finished  in Ghent, Belgium, totaling  in the province of East Flanders. Dutch rider Anna van der Breggen won in a two-up sprint with Ellen van Dijk.

Teams
25 teams were confirmed for the race giving 200 riders in total.

UCI Women's Teams

National teams
United States

Domestic teams

Isorex
Keukens Redant
Napoleon Ladies
Sprinters Malderen

Race
After the first hour where the bunch remained together, there were several attacks with  dominating the race. With  to go Ellen van Dijk escaped from a front group of 15 riders on the Molenberg with Anna van der Breggen the only one who could follow her. The duo extended their advantage over the cobbled sections that followed, holding off the chase group to the line, where van Dijk lost the two-up sprint. Behind them Lizzie Armitstead sprinted to third place.

Results

References

Omloop Het Nieuwsblad – Women's race
Omloop Het Nieuwsblad
Omloop Het Nieuwsblad